The Pacific Coast International League was a minor league baseball league that played between 1918 and 1922. The Class B level league franchises were based in the Northwest United States and British Columbia.

History
The Pacific Coast International League was a re–branding of the former Northwestern League and was known as the Northwest International League in 1919. In 1922, the name was changed to the Western International League.

Teams in the league included the Aberdeen Black Cats, Portland Buckaroos, Seattle Giants, Spokane Indians, Tacoma Tigers, Vancouver Beavers, Victoria Islanders and Yakima Indians.

As the Northwest International League, it consisted of two Washington–based teams and two Canada-based teams: the Seattle Drydockers, Tacoma Tigers, Vancouver Beavers and Victoria Tyrees. On June 8, 1919, the league disbanded, with the Beavers in first place. Therefore, they were the de facto league champions. The Tigers finished in last place with a 5–17 record. Wally Hood, who played in the major leagues from 1920 to 1922, spent time in the league. 

Hall of Fame baseball pitcher Joe McGinnity played for the Vancouver Beavers in 1918.

Cities Represented 
 Aberdeen, WA: Aberdeen Black Cats 1918 
 Portland, OR: Portland Buckaroos 1918 
 Seattle, WA: Seattle Giants 1918, 1920
 Spokane, WA: Spokane Indians 1918, 1920 
 Tacoma, WA: Tacoma Tigers 1918, 1920–1921
 Vancouver, BC: Vancouver Beavers 1918, 1920–1921 
 Vancouver, WA: Vancouver Beavers 1918
 Victoria, BC: Victoria Islanders 1920; Victoria Bees 1921
 Yakima, WA: Yakima Indians 1920–1921

Standings & statistics

1918 Pacific Coast International League
schedule
 Tacoma and Spokane disbanded May 26; Vancouver, British Columbia (26–28) moved to Vancouver, Washington June 25. The league suspended operations July 7.

1920 Pacific Coast International League
schedule
 No Playoffs Scheduled.

1921 Pacific Coast International League
schedule
 No Playoffs Scheduled.

References

External links
Baseball Reference

Defunct baseball leagues in the United States
Sports leagues established in 1918
Baseball leagues in Washington (state)
Defunct minor baseball leagues in the United States
Sports leagues disestablished in 1921